The Danske Evangelist Lutheran Kirke (Danish Evangelical Lutheran Church; Denmark Evangelical Lutheran Church) is a church in Denmark, Kansas.  It was added to the National Register in 1991.

It is a one-story gable-front building made of limestone. Its main portion was built in c.1875-1880 and its bell tower and entry were added in 1901. It includes Gothic detailing.

References

External links

National Register Nomination form

Danish-American culture in Kansas
Lutheran churches in Kansas
Churches on the National Register of Historic Places in Kansas
Gothic Revival church buildings in Kansas
Churches completed in 1875
Buildings and structures in Lincoln County, Kansas
National Register of Historic Places in Lincoln County, Kansas